This is a list of meetings of the European Council (informally referred to as EU summits); the meetings of the European Council, an institution of the European Union (EU) comprising heads of state or government of EU member states. They started in 1975 as tri-annual meetings. The number of meetings grew to minimum four per year between 1996 and 2007, and minimum six per year since 2008. From 2008 to 2015, an average of seven council meetings per year took place (see list below).

Since 2008, an annual average of two special Euro summits were also organized in addition – and often in parallel – to the EU summits. As the agenda of Euro summits is restricted solely to discuss issues for the eurozone and only invite political leaders of the eurozone member states, such meetings are not counted as European Councils.

The current practice is that meetings are always called and organized to the extent found needed by the European Council president. The upcoming ordinary meetings are scheduled by the end of each semester for the third following semester (minimum one year in advance), and can take form either as "scheduled ordinary meetings" (resulting in a published document entitled "conclusions") or "informal ordinary meetings" (resulting in a published document entitled "statement"). A called scheduled/informal ordinary upcoming meeting might occasionally be moved or cancelled within a short notice, with such change then being notified by the Council president through the issue of a revised calendar plan for the ordinary meetings within the semester in concern. If extra meetings are called outside the procedure of notification minimum a half-year in advance, they are referred to as being "extraordinary meetings".

List
The first seven summit meetings were held between 1961 and 1974, but this was before the formal establishment of the European Council. Some sources however consider them to be the informal seven first meetings of the European Council.

1970s

1980s

1990s

2000s

2010s

Since 2010, all formal (scheduled or extraordinary) European Council meetings have taken place in Brussels and been chaired by a permanent President, as introduced by the Treaty of Lisbon. In February 2010 the exact location was the Solvay Library, subsequent meetings took place at the Justus Lipsius building and since March 2017 at the Europa Building.

2020s

Notable details

Cologne 1999

The European Council met in Cologne, Germany, on 3–4 June 1999 to consider issues after the Treaty of Amsterdam came into force. Romano Prodi presented his plan for the future Commission's work and reform program. The Council called for an EU Charter of Fundamental Rights.

The Council designated Javier Solana for the post of Secretary-General of the Council of the European Union (with Pierre de Boissieu as his deputy) and High Representative for the Common Foreign and Security Policy (CFSP). It decided on a common policy on Russia (first use of the CFSP). Adopted the declaration on Kosovo. In relation to the European Security and Defence Policy, a major element of the CFSP, the council declared that the EU "must have the capacity for autonomous action, backed up by credible military forces, the means to decide to use them, and a readiness to do so, in order to respond to international crises without prejudice to actions by NATO".

Gothenburg 2001

The 2001 meeting of the European Council was held in the Swedish city of Gothenburg, from 14 to 16 June.

The EU Summit focused upon EU enlargement, sustainable development, economic growth and structural reform issues. The EU–US summit included a visit by U.S. president George W. Bush on 14 June. It was the first U.S. presidential visit to Sweden, and was intended as an opportunity to discuss differences on climate negotiations, WTO and Middle East issues with the EU leaders. It was marred by extensive demonstrations.

The main protests were organised by three broad coalitions, a local coalition Bush Go home that opposed U.S. foreign policy, a Sweden-based coalition Network Gothenburg 2001 which opposed Swedish membership in the EU and EMU and an international coalition Gothenburg Action 2001, a proponent of "another Europe", opponent of EU militarisation, the Schengen Agreement, and defending the public sector and the environment from becoming trade commodities and EMU. There was also a broad Iranian and a smaller anti-capitalist coalition as well as non-violent networks and Reclaim the Streets organising demonstrations and a street party.

According to the police, more than 50,000 demonstrators gathered in Gothenburg during the three days of the summit, among them a smaller number with foreign nationality. The demonstrating organisations arranged many conferences, the biggest conference (besides, of course, the EU summit itself) being Fritt forum (Free Forum) which hosted 50 lectures and seminars and was funded by the city of Gothenburg, the Swedish justice department and Sweden's foreign ministry department among others. The summit was guarded by approximately 2500 police officers.

Besides a number of encounters and skirmishes there were a number of riots. The first one occurred on 14 June after the police had surrounded and enclosed the Hvitfeldtska gymnasiet where demonstrators had been invited by the city to stay during the summit. The second occurred in the morning of 15 June in conjunction with a demonstration of 2000 participants organised by the anti-capitalist organisation, and it resulted in violent clashes with the police and damage of Gothenburg's main street Kungsportsavenyn. Later in the evening during the Reclaim the City demonstration, a police unit came under attack by demonstrators throwing projectiles. The police subsequently fired shots at the demonstrators. Three persons were injured by gunshots, one of whom was seriously injured. This was the first use of firearms against Swedish demonstrators since the Ådalen shootings in 1931.

The riots were followed by prison sentences for 64 persons convicted of criminal behaviour. In total demonstrators were sent to prison for almost 50 years. As of 2006, no police officer has been convicted of wrongdoing during the summit. One officer was tried and convicted for committing perjury during a trial against a Gothenburg demonstrator.

The riots left large areas of central Gothenburg demolished due to the violent protests of the demonstrators, as well as leaving many stores looted.

The summit meeting of the European Union was notable because heads of states from the EU gathered in Gothenburg, and also because the American President George W. Bush visited Sweden for the first time on the day before the summit meeting. As a reaction to this, protesters from all over the world planned to gather in Gothenburg to demonstrate under different banners. The City of Gothenburg assisted the out-of-town protesters by providing living quarters in different schools around Gothenburg and a convergence center, first at Hvitfeldtska gymnasiet and later moved to Schillerska Gymnasiet.

The political background to the protests was a conjuncture of three forces. EU-criticism and opposition to membership in the EU was stronger in Sweden than anywhere else in the union. Secondly a wave of globalisation protests against neoliberalism had gained momentum after the protests during the EU Summit in Amsterdam 1997 and the WTO meeting in Seattle 1999. Anti-war and environmental concerns against the U.S. was a third factor.

The police planned and gathered their forces in anticipation of the meeting. Never before had this many heads of state met in Sweden, and thousands of police were to stand guard in Gothenburg to keep order during these three days of June 2001. The police had long prepared for disturbances and also had many different intelligence services directed at the groups participating in the planning of demonstrations. There were differing opinions amongst the police forces involved. The security police did not want the Hvitfeldtska gymnasiet to be used as they felt it was too close to the EU Summit while the Gothenburg police insisted on having the demonstrators there. American police tactics against protesters were in use such as a psycho-tactic unit that was supposed to have a dialogue with demonstrating organisations.

The police, the local authority and the different demonstration coalitions had arranged a dialogue group where they planned and discussed the demonstrations to ensure they would be as peaceful as possible.

The officers in command of the action stated that they were very pleased with how the police had served during the summit (an opinion which at the time was shared by the government). It was claimed that the police successfully had used advance information about demonstrators and undercover police officers among the demonstrators to among other things find out about the "secret" information central.

According to the police, they acted completely in accordance with the Police Law.

The Swedish Police Union strongly criticised the way the police actions had been led and managed. In its report "Chaos" – regarding the Command in Gothenburg in June 2001 it is stated that a majority of the police who were on duty during the time felt they did not have enough resources to carry out their duties in a proper manner and that orders were confusing.

Statistics:
 Crimes reported: 3,143 (as of February 2002)
 Detained (gripna) for criminal actions: 554
 Detained (omhändertagna) by the police (including following two listings): 575
 Detained (omhändertagna) by the police in the power of §13 of the police law (aka PL13): 387
 Detained (omhändertagna) by the police in the power of §11 of the police law (aka PL11): 188
 Arrested (anhållna): 107
 Detained while pending trial (häktade): 59
 Number of verdicts: 38
 Number of "EU-related" (i.e. related to events during the EU-summit) persons injured (treated by hospitals in the region of Västra Götaland): 143
 Police: 53
 Demonstrators: 90

The total sum of the sentences following the riots during the EU summit was roughly 50 years in prison, which according to the journalist Erik Wijk is 12 times more than earlier riots. No police were convicted despite a large number of complaints.

One of the most noticed cases is the so-called information central, which was stormed by Nationella insatsstyrkan during the first day of the summit. A total of eight persons (five men, three women) were sentenced to long prison sentences after having sent out text messages urging people to go to Hvitfeldtska gymnasiet in connection with the police shutdown of the school.

The police officer in charge for the EU summit, was accused in a trial of preventing about 100 people at the Schillerska from leaving the place for several hours, but was found innocent.

Göteborgsaktionen ("The Gothenburg Action") involved 87 organisations out of whom 33 were Swedish, 22 Danish, 9 Finnish, 5 Norwegian, 4 European and some other mainly from different Eastern European countries. Nätverket Göteborg ("The Gothenburg Network") involved over 20 organisations.

Laeken 2001
The Laeken European Council was held at the royal palace at Laeken, Belgium, on 14–15 December 2001.

The Laeken European Council dealt with:
 New measures in the area of Justice and Home Affairs: the European arrest warrant, a common definition of "terrorism", and EUROJUST
 The seats of ten new EU agencies (after hours of disagreement, the European Council failed to reach an agreement and decided to leave the decision until next year)
 Impending introduction of Euro cash (the European Council met with the Finance ministers to consider this)
 Progress of EU enlargement
 The adoption of the Laeken Declaration on the Future of Europe

The Laeken Declaration on the Future of Europe established the European Convention, presided over with former President of France, Valéry Giscard d'Estaing, as President of the convention, and former Italian Prime Minister Giuliano Amato and former Belgian Prime Minister Jean-Luc Dehaene as Vice-Presidents. The convention was tasked with drafting the Treaty establishing a Constitution for Europe, and would have about 60 members, drawn from national governments, national parliamentarians, the European Parliament, and the European Commission, and include representatives from the candidate countries. The declaration reviews the progress of European integration over the last fifty years, tracing it back to its origins in the horrors of World War II, and poses a number of questions to be answered by the convention.

See also
 Euro summit
 President of the European Council
 1955 Messina Conference
 1983 Solemn Declaration on European Union
 1992 Edinburgh Agreement

References

External links
European Council official homepage
Council meeting conclusions (2004-today) – European Council official homepage
50 years of summit meetings – history of European Council meetings (1961–2010) – General Secretariat of the Council of the EU
The European Council in 2010 – annual presidential summary report of the European Council meeting activities
The European Council in 2011 – annual presidential summary report of the European Council meeting activities
The European Council in 2012 – annual presidential summary report of the European Council meeting activities
The European Council in 2013 – annual presidential summary report of the European Council meeting activities
The European Council in 2014 – annual presidential summary report of the European Council meeting activities
List of European Councils (1961–2014) – European NAvigator

European Council
20th-century diplomatic conferences
21st-century diplomatic conferences (Europe)